Booty Bounce may refer to:
 "Booty Bounce" (Dev song), 2010
 "Booty Bounce" (Tujamo and Taio Cruz song), 2016
 Booty bounce, a slang for twerking